Eugenie Bouchard and Jessica Pegula were the defending champions, having won the event in 2012, but Bouchard chose not to participate in 2013. Pegula partnered up with Emily Harman, but lost in the quarterfinals to Irina Falconi and Maria Sanchez.

Julia Cohen and Tatjana Maria won the title, defeating Falconi and Sanchez in the final, 6–4, 4–6, [11–9].

Seeds

Draw

References 
 Draw

Dothan Pro Tennis Classic - Doubles
Hardee's Pro Classic